Despicable is an EP by British extreme metal band Carcass. It was released through Nuclear Blast on 30 October 2020.

Track listing

Personnel
 Jeff Walker – bass, lead vocals
 Bill Steer – guitars, backing vocals
 Daniel Wilding – drums, additional vocals

References

2020 albums
Carcass (band) albums
Nuclear Blast albums